NGC 4660 is an elliptical galaxy located about 63 million light-years away in the constellation Virgo. The galaxy was discovered by astronomer William Herschel on March 15, 1784 and is a member of the Virgo Cluster.

NGC 4660 forms a tight pair with Messier 59.

Tidal filament 
A long tidal filament was detected associated with NGC 4660. This appears to indicate a past gravitational interaction with another galaxy. The progenitor galaxy that may have produced the filament associated with NGC 4660 was a gas-rich spiral. Alternatively, the detection of tidal dwarf galaxies (TDGs) which are “recycled” low-mass galaxies formed from interactions or mergers suggest that the filament originated from a possible satellite galaxy that got stripped during its closest approach in its orbit to NGC 4660. This would make the filament a tidal stream comparable to the stream associated with the Sagittarius Dwarf Spheroidal Galaxy of the Milky Way.

Supermassive black hole
NGC 4660 may have a supermassive black hole with an estimated mass of 800 million suns ( M☉).

See also 
 List of NGC objects (4001–5000)
 Satellite galaxies of the Milky Way

References

External links

Virgo (constellation)
Elliptical galaxies
4660
42917
7914
Astronomical objects discovered in 1784
Virgo Cluster